The Poker Superstars Invitational Tournament was a series of no limit Texas hold 'em poker tournaments. The first season is available on NTSC DVD. It airs on Fox Sports Net in the United States, Rogers Sportsnet in Canada and Ftn in the United Kingdom.

Results

Crew
The first series was hosted by Chris Rose, with support from poker author Michael Konik and poker professional Mark Gregorich. Mark Gregorich left the show at the end of the first season.

The first series grand finale aired in February 2005 on the same day as Super Bowl XXXIX. Fox carried the Super Bowl that year, so instead of the series' usual home on FSN, NBC carried the finale instead. It was hosted by Matt Vasgersian, with support from poker professional Erick Lindgren. Backstage interviews were conducted by poker player Evelyn Ng.

The first series was executive produced by David Doyle and Directed by Brian Lockwood.

Howard "The Professor" Lederer replaced Michael Konik at the beginning of the 3rd season, with Annie Duke joining for several episodes as a "special guest". Mary Strong conducted the backstage interviews.

Structure

Season 1
The tournament was split into two series, with each player's finishing position in the series final determining their starting chip count in the grand finale.

Similarly, the finishing position in two preliminary rounds per series determined the starting chip positions of each player in both series finals.

The Grand Final winner received $1,000,000. The payouts for the other entrants from the $3,200,000 prize pool were unclear in the broadcast. However, Phil Ivey has said, on Full Tilt, that he walked away with about $400,000, and, therefore, broke even.

In the first two rounds of each series, players start with 100,000 in chips. Their finish in each of these rounds determines their starting chips for the final round of the series as follows:

Finish
 250,000
 150,000
 112,000
 88,000
 72,000
 56,000
 40,000
 32,000

Series 1 Round 1 finish + Series 1 Round 2 finish = Starting chips for Series 1 Final

Series 2 uses the same format. Finishes in each series final are then used to determine the Grand Finale starting chip count as follows:

Finish - Finals
 500,000
 300,000
 224,000
 176,000
 144,000
 112,000
 80,000
 64,000

Series 1 Final finish + Series 2 Final finish = Starting chips for grand finale.

Season 2
24 Players

Blind structure
The blinds increased every 20 minutes.

Qualifying rounds
Six players competed in each tournament, with points being allocated as follows:

 Winner: 10 points
 Runner-Up: 7 points
 3rd place: 5 points
 4th place: 3 points
 5th place: 1 point
 6th place: 0 points 

Each player played six preliminary tournaments with players randomly drawn. At the end of this, the points were tallied and the 16 players with the most points progressed to the next round.

Final 16
The top 16 are then split into 4 pools of players

Players in the final 16 started with 25,000 chips for every point earned up to then. (20,000 in Season 3)

Each pool had two matches, with points being allocated as follows:

 Winner: 10 points
 Runner-Up: 7 points
 3rd place: 4 points
 4th place: 0 points

The points were cumulated from those 2 matches, and the players with the highest points then progressed to the quarter-finals.

Quarter-finals
The quarter-finals are 2 groups with 4 players in each. Each group will play one match where the top two finishers will advance to the semi-finals.  The winner of the match will start the semi-finals with 1,000,000 in chips while the runner up will start with 700,000.  Players start with 50,000 chips per point earned in the round of 16.

Semi-finals and finals
Both the semi-finals and finals were played in best two out of three heads-up matches.

Time limit rule
Players had 60 seconds to act on their hands. A player failing to act was penalized the worth of one small blind. An additional small blind penalty would be imposed for each additional ten seconds without action. The collected penalties were added to the next pot. Kathy Liebert and Mimi Tran were the only players penalized in season two, for one small blind.

Payouts
The payouts were as follows:

Winner=$400,000 USD

Runner Up=$140,000 USD

The total prize pool was $1.21 million.  It is unclear who supplied the extra $250,000 for the pool, since 24 times 40,000 equals only $960,000.  (NOTE: This problem was solved in Season 3 with a $1.2 million prize pool and $50,000 buy-in.)

Season 3
Season 3 played exactly like Season 2, except for the following differences:

 The entry fee was $50,000 instead of $40,000 and the prize pool was $1.2 million instead of $1.21 million.
 Each player played five preliminary tournaments instead of six with players randomly drawn.
 The finals were played in best 3-out-of-5 rather than 2-out-of-3.
 The Top 16 Players were split into 4 groups and played 2 games with 20,000 chips for every point earned up to then. The winner of each game, with the winner of game one not participating in two, advance to the quarterfinals, starting there with 600,000 resp. 400,000 chips. Same format is used in the quarter finals, with the two advancing to the semi-finals starting with 1,500,000 resp. 1,000,000 chips.
 The time limit rule was modified. After 60 seconds, a player had five seconds to act before being assessed a one small blind penalty. An additional small blind penalty would be assessed for each additional 30 seconds without action. Phil Ivey was assessed a penalty in his first Super Sixteen match.

Payouts

Competitors
 Season 1 featured 8 competitors each paying $400,000 to enter. (This $400,000 entry fee was the largest in history until the Big One for One Drop in 2012)
 Season 2 featured 24 competitors each paying $40,000 to enter, and $250,000 added to the prize pool.
 Season 3 featured 24 competitors each paying $50,000 to enter.

Computer versions
There have been two computer games made of the first two seasons of the show.   
 Poker Superstars Invitational Tournament   
 Poker Superstars II   
 Poker Superstars III

There is an online web version made in flash of the computer game
 Poker Superstars II Web Game
    
These were published by Funkitron and available at Play Poker Superstars, the official Funkitron Poker Superstars website.   
    
The AI used in them was created by Brian Sheppard, the programmer who created the Maven Scrabble playing AI for Scrabble.

External links
Finding the Ace Among Kings: A True Story (The Making of the Show)
Poker Superstars (Article by Mike Sexton)
Episode reviews 
Pokersuperstars.net (official site of show)

 
Poker tournaments
Television shows about poker
Poker in North America